Deepam is a 1980 Indian Malayalam film,  directed by P. Chandrakumar and produced by Renji Mathew. The film stars Madhu, Jayan, Srividya and Seema in the lead roles. The film has musical score by Shyam. The film was a remake of the Hindi film Main Tulsi Tere Aangan Ki.

Cast

Madhu as Mr. Varma
Jayan as Ajaykumar
Srividya as Padmini
Seema as Thulasi
Sukumari as Varma's Mother
Praveena as Geetha
Sathaar as Prathap
Baby Sangeetha
Mala Aravindan as Subrahmanyam
Master Naveen
Priya as Mini
T. P. Madhavan as Geetha's Father
Vanchiyoor Radha as Bhargavi
Vallathol Unnikrishnan
Radhadevi
 sathyachithra

Soundtrack
The music was composed by Shyam and the lyrics were written by Sathyan Anthikkad.

References

External links
 

1980 films
1980s Malayalam-language films
Malayalam remakes of Hindi films
Films directed by P. Chandrakumar